Kerri K. Greenidge is an American historian and academic. Her book Black Radical: The Life and Times of William Monroe Trotter, a biography of civil rights activist William Monroe Trotter, won the 2020 Mark Lynton History Prize. Her sisters are the playwright Kirsten Greenidge and the novelist Kaitlyn Greenidge.

Biography 
Greenidge is Mellon Assistant Professor in the Department of Studies in Race, Colonialism, and Diaspora at Tufts University, director of American Studies and co-director of the African American Trail Project at Tufts' Center for the Study of Race and Democracy.

Previously Greenidge worked as a historian for the Boston African American National Historic Site, under the auspices of which she wrote and published Boston Abolitionists, a short history of the role that Black leaders in Boston's Beacon Hill neighborhood played in the Abolitionist Movement in the pre-Civil War era.

Greenidge's research focuses on the role that African-American literature has played in the Civil Rights Movement and particularly its more radical expressions in Boston during the Progressive Era, as well as its intersection with populism in the Democratic Party.

Greenidge signed 2020 A Letter on Justice and Open Debate, but asked later for her name to be removed from the letter, which was done.

Greenidge's 2022 book The Grimkes: The Legacy of Slavery in an American Family was a finalist for the 2023 National Book Critics Circle award in biography. In a glowing review, the New York Times notes that Greenidge establishes "the sisters’ contributions to abolition and women’s rights were undergirded by the privileges they reaped from slavery." Smithsonian (magazine) named the book one of the ten best history books of 2022.

Publications 

 Greenidge, K. (2006). Boston's abolitionists. Beverly, Mass: Commonwealth Editions.
 Greenidge, K. (2020). Black radical: The life and times of William Monroe Trotter.

References

External links

Year of birth missing (living people)
Living people
Tufts University faculty
American women biographers
21st-century American biographers
21st-century American women writers
21st-century African-American women writers
21st-century African-American writers